Euchromia guineensis is a moth of the subfamily Arctiinae first described by Johan Christian Fabricius in 1775. It is found in Angola, Cameroon, the Republic of the Congo, the Democratic Republic of the Congo, Equatorial Guinea, Gabon, Ghana, Nigeria, Sierra Leone, the Gambia and Uganda.

References

Moths described in 1775
Moths of Africa
Euchromiina
Taxa named by Johan Christian Fabricius